Sokkan or Sokan or Sekan may refer to:
 Sokkan, Isfahan
 Sokkan, Fereydunshahr, Isfahan Province
 Sokkan, Sistan and Baluchestan